Studio Retail Group plc, known until July 2019 as Findel plc, is a British home shopping company, based in Accrington, Lancashire.  It is listed on the London Stock Exchange though its shares have been suspended since 14 February 2022, when it announced its intention to appoint administrators. Its chairman has been Ian Burke since 16 December 2016.

In April 2021 Studio sold the Findel Education businesses for £30 million.

On 14 February 2022, Studio announced its intention to appoint administrators because options to secure additional borrowing had failed, leaving it insolvent. It’s shares are currently suspended on the London Stock Exchange.

Group Companies

Studio Retail Limited 
Studio Retail Limited, formerly Express Gifts Ltd, the largest company within the Findel plc group, sells clothing, greeting cards, gifts, home and garden items through its Studio and Ace catalogues and websites.

Studio Retail Limited is a multi-channel retailer that offers home shopping services through a combination of direct catalogue marketing and online shopping. It is a credit proposition offering credit accounts.

Studio Retail Limited operates through the brands Studio and Ace, and formerly HalfCost and Health & Home Shopping.

Findel Wholesale Limited

Findel Europe B.V.

Findel Sourcing (Shanghai) Limited, Findel Asia Sourcing Limited,  Express Gifts Philippines Inc.

Findel Asia Sourcing; sources products for group companies and third parties.  Express Gifts Limited Philippines Inc. provides call centre services to Express Gifts Limited.

History

Findel started as a greeting card company and went public in the early 1960s under the name "Fine Art Developments."  It spun off its greeting card business in 1997 as a separate company called "Creative Publishing", which was subsequently acquired by Hallmark Cards in 1998.  The company changed its name to "Findel plc" in 2000 and then to Studio Retail Group plc in 2019.

In August 2010, Findel sold CWIO, Confetti.co.uk and I Want One of Those (IWOOT) to The Hut Group.

In April 2013, Findel sold its healthcare division, NRS, to LDC, and in March 2015 Findel sold its Kleeneze business to CVSL Inc.

In February 2016, Findel sold its online sports retailing business, Kitbag, to the leading US provider of licensed sports apparel and merchandise, Fanatics, Inc., a snub to Mike Ashley & Sports Direct who had expressed interest in the brand. Sports Direct acquired an 18.9% share in Findel but was unsuccessful in appointing a director.

In April 2017, Findel appointed Phil Maudsley as group CEO.

In June 2019, Findel announced plans to rename itself as Studio Retail Group, and this change came into effect in July.

In February 2022, Studio Retail Group announced plans to call in administrators after a £25 million funding bid failed. The company was then purchased by Frasers Group for £26.8 million.

Leadership 
In 2020, Studio Retail Group PLC nominated Paul Kendrick as the CEO of the Group. He took over from the previous CEO, Phil Maudsley, when he retired in March 2021.

Kendrick joined the company as Studio Retail's commercial and deputy managing director in May 2016 before being promoted to managing director in April 2017. In December 2019, he was appointed to the company’s Board of Directors.

References

Retail companies of the United Kingdom
Companies based in Tameside
Companies that have entered administration in the United Kingdom
2022 mergers and acquisitions